Bhadole is a large village situated along the Warana River basin in the Hatkanangale Taluka of Kolhapur District in the state of Maharashtra, India.

Demographics 
As per Population Census 2011, the Bhadole village has in total 2,280 families residing in village with a population of 11,273 of which 5,848 are males while 5,425 are females. Average Sex Ratio of Bhadole village is 928. Child Sex Ratio for the Bhadole as per census is 824.

Literacy 
In 2011, literacy rate of Bhadole village was 81.42%. In Bhadole Male literacy stands at 89.17% while female literacy rate was 73.20%.

Governance 
As per constitution of India and Panchyati Raj Act (1992), Bhadole village is administered by Sarpanch (Head of Village) who is elected representative of village with the help of 16 members and Gram Sevak.

Nearby Places 
Nearby places (with distances) are Kini (3  km), Vathar Tarf Vadgaon (8.3 km), Peth Vadgaon (3.8 km), Shigaon (4.4 km), Hatkanangale (23.5 km), Kolhapur (26.2 km) via NH-4, Jotiba (24.9 km), Panhala (33 km), Warananagar (17.3 km).

Education 
Jai Shivrai Shikshan Prasarak Mandal's Bhadole Highschool Bhadole is a premier school in village and also has Z.P. Schools for boys as well as girls.

References

Villages in Kolhapur district